Garvetagh is a small village in County Tyrone, Northern Ireland, near Castlederg. In the 2001 Census it had a population of 69 people. It lies within the Strabane District Council area.

References

See also 
List of villages in Northern Ireland

Villages in County Tyrone